Gracy Goswami is an Indian actress who mainly works in Hindi television and films. She made her acting debut in 2014 portraying Pinky Patil in Bandhan. Goswami is best known for her portrayal of Nandini Shekhar in Balika Vadhu and Amrit Sahani in Kyun Utthe Dil Chhod Aaye.

She made her film debut with Begum Jaan in 2017 and portrayed Young Khanzada Begum in the 2021 web series The Empire.

Early life 
Goswami was born on 31 May 2003 in Vadodara, Gujarat.

Career

At the age of 11 in 2014, Goswami landed her first television series Bandhan on Sony Entertainment Television as Pinky Patil but was replaced by Priyanka Purohit in January 2015. Additionally, she was next selected to play the character of young Nandini Shekhar in Colors TV's one of longest-running series Balika Vadhu and quit in April 2016 to participate in the same channel's dance reality show Jhalak Dikhhla Jaa 8. In 2017, she made her film debut with Srijit Mukherji's periodic film Begum Jaan in which she played Laadli. That same year, she appeared in an episode of crime drama Crime Patrol as Shilpi Rane. Next, Goswami portrayed Princess Garima in Star Bharat's Mayavi Maling. In 2020, she appeared in Anubhav Sinha's social drama Thappad playing Sania.

Filmography

Television

Special appearances

Films

 All films are in Hindi unless noted.

Web series

References

External links
 

2003 births
Living people
Indian television child actresses
21st-century Indian actresses
People from Vadodara
Gujarati people